The Battle off Texel, also known as the Action off Texel or the Action of 17 October 1914, was a naval battle off the coast of the Dutch island of Texel during the First World War. A British squadron, comprising one light cruiser and four destroyers on a routine patrol, encountered the German 7th Half Flotilla of torpedo boats which was en route to the British coast to lay mines. The British forces attacked and the outgunned German force attempted to flee and then fought a desperate and ineffective action against the British force, which sank all four German boats.

The battle resulted in the loss of the German torpedo boat squadron and prevented the mining of busy shipping lanes, such as the mouth of the River Thames. The British had few casualties and little damage to their vessels. The battle influenced the tactics and deployments of the remaining German torpedo boat flotillas in the North Sea area, as the loss shook the faith of their commanders in the effectiveness of the force.

Background
After the opening naval Battle of Heligoland Bight, the German High Seas Fleet was ordered to avoid confrontations with larger opposing forces, to avoid costly and demoralising reverses. Apart from occasional German raids and forays by German light forces, the North Sea was dominated by the Royal Navy which regularly patrolled the area. The German ships made no hostile move against the British and made no attempt to flee; the British assuming that they had mistaken the ships for friendly vessels. The German flotilla was part of the Emden Patrol and had been sent out of the Ems River, to mine the southern coast of Britain including the mouth of the Thames but had been intercepted before reaching its objective.

The British squadron out-gunned the German 7th Half Flotilla. HMS Undaunted—an Arethusa-class light cruiser—was armed with two BL 6 inch Mk XII naval guns and seven QF 4 inch Mk V naval guns, in single mounts (most without gun shields) and eight torpedo tubes. Undaunted was experimentally armed with a pair of 2-pounder anti-aircraft guns, something most of her class lacked and at best speed could make . The four Laforey-class destroyers were armed with four torpedo tubes in two twin mounts, three 4-inch guns and a 2-pounder gun. The German vessels were inferior to the British in other areas, the 7th Half Flotilla was composed of ageing  1898 class boats and had been completed in 1904. Each of the German vessels was armed with three  guns, that were of shorter range and throw-weight than the British guns. The biggest danger to the British squadron was the five  torpedoes carried by each German boat.

Battle

Upon closer approach, the German vessels realised the nearby vessels were British and scattered, while Undaunted—which was closer to the Germans than the destroyers—opened fire on the nearest torpedo boat. This German vessel managed to dodge the fire from Undaunted by changing course but lost speed and the British force caught up. To protect Undaunted from torpedo attack and to destroy the Germans as quickly as possible, Fox ordered the squadron to divide. Lance and Lennox chased S115 and S119 as Legion and Loyal pursued S117 and S118. Fire from Legion, Loyal and Undaunted damaged S118 so badly that its bridge was blown off the deck, sinking her at 15:17. Lance and Lennox engaged S115, disabling her steering gear and causing the German vessel to circle. Lennoxs fire was so effective that the bridge of S115 was also destroyed but the German torpedo-boat did not strike her colours.

The two central boats in the German flotilla, S117 and  the flotilla leader S119, tried to hit Undaunted with torpedoes but Undaunted outmanoeuvred the German boats and remained unscathed. When Legion and Loyal had finished off S118, they came to Undaunteds aid and engaged the two attackers. Legion attacked S117, which fired its last three torpedoes and continued to engage with gunfire. Legion pulverised S117, damaging her steering mechanism which forced her to circle before she was sunk at 15:30. At the same time, Lance and Lennox had damaged S115 to the point where only one of the destroyers was needed. Lance joined Loyal in bombarding S119 with lyddite shells. S119 managed to fire a torpedo at Lance and hit the destroyer amidships but the torpedo failed to detonate. S119 was sunk at 15:35 by gunfire from Lance and Loyal, taking the German flotilla commander down with it. S115 stayed afloat despite constant attacks from Lennox, which sent a boarding party, who found a wreck with only one German on board who happily surrendered. Thirty members of the crew were eventually rescued from the sea by the British vessels. The action ended at 16:30, with gunfire from Undaunted finishing off the abandoned hulk of S115.

Aftermath

Analysis

The battle was seen as a great boost of morale for the British as two days previous, they had lost the cruiser  to a U-boat. The effect on British morale is reflected in its inclusion in the 1915 novel The Boy Allies Under Two Flags, written by Robert L. Drake. The hospital ship , which had been sent out to rescue survivors from the sunken boats, was seized by the British for violating the Hague Convention rules on the use of hospital ships. The loss of a squadron of German torpedo boats led to a drastic change in tactics in the English Channel and along the coast of Flanders. There were fewer sorties into the Channel and the torpedo boat force was relegated to coastal patrol and rescuing aircrew. The British received a bonus on 30 November, when a trawler pulled up the sealed chest thrown off S119 by Captain Thiele. The chest contained a codebook used by the German light forces stationed on the coast, allowing the British to read German wireless communication for long afterwards.

Casualties

Despite the odds, no German vessel struck her colours and the flotilla fought to the end. The four ships of the German Seventh Half Flotilla were sunk by Harwich Force and over two hundred sailors were killed, including the commanding officer. Thirty-one German sailors were rescued and taken prisoner; a captured officer died of wounds soon after. Two more German sailors were later rescued by a neutral vessel. Only four British sailors were wounded and three of their destroyers were lightly damaged. Legion had one  shell hit and one man was wounded by machine-gun fire. Loyal was hit twice and had three or four men wounded. Lance had superficial machine-gun damage and the other vessels were unscathed.

Order of battle

Royal Navy
3rd Destroyer Flotilla (detachment), Captain Cecil H. Fox, Captain (D)
 , light cruiser acting as flotilla leader
1st division, 3rd Destroyer Flotilla
 , destroyer; Commander Wion de M. Egerton, division commander
 , destroyer; Lieutenant-Commander Clement. R. Dane, commander
 , destroyer; Lieutenant-Commander Claud F. Allsup, commander
 , destroyer; Lieutenant-Commander Burges Watson, commander

German Navy
7th Torpedoboat Half-flotilla, Korvettenkapitän Georg Thiele, commander
 , torpedo boat, flagship; Oberleutnant zur See Wilhelm Windel, commander
 , torpedo boat; Kapitänleutnant Erich Beckert, commander
 , torpedo boat; Kapitänleutnant Georg Sohnke, commander
 , torpedo boat; Kapitänleutnant Hans Mushacke, commander

Notes

Citations

References 

Books
 
 
 
 
 
 
 
 
 
 
 

Journals
 

Websites

Further reading
 

North Sea operations of World War I
Naval battles of World War I involving the United Kingdom
Naval battles of World War I involving Germany
Conflicts in 1914
October 1914 events